The New Heritage Keyboard Quartet is an album by American jazz keyboardists Roland Hanna and Mickey Tucker recorded in 1973 and released on the Blue Note label.

Reception

The Allmusic review awarded the album 2 stars.

Track listing
All compositions by Mickey Tucker, except where indicated.
 "Zap! Carnivorous" (John Hicks) – 7:27
 "Sin No. 86½" – 7:14
 "State of Affairs" – 6:57
 "Delphi" (R. Williamson) – 7:44
 "Monstrosity March" – 7:18
 "Child of Gemini: So You Will Know My Name" (Roland Hanna) – 4:13

Personnel
Mickey Tucker, Roland Hanna - piano, clavinet, harpsichord
Richard Davis - bass
Eddie Gladden -  drums, percussion

References

1973 albums
Blue Note Records albums
Roland Hanna albums
Mickey Tucker albums